The Derbyshire Girls & Ladies League is a women's association football league in England. Covering the county of Derbyshire, the league consists of two adult divisions sitting at levels 7 and 8 of the women's football pyramid system, as well as girls' youth divisions from ages under-8 to under-18. It promotes to the East Midlands Regional Women's Football League Division One. Women's matches are played on Sundays and girls' matches are played on Saturdays.

Current teams (2019-20 season)

Division One

Division Two

Previous winners

League tables (2019-20 season)

Division 1

Division 2

References

External links
FA Official Website
Derbyshire Girls and Ladies Football League 2016-2017

7
Football in Derbyshire